The Hockey East Association, also known as Hockey East, is a college ice hockey conference which operates entirely in New England. It participates in the NCAA's Division I as a hockey-only conference.

Hockey East came into existence in 1984 for men's hockey when most of its current members split from what is today known as ECAC Hockey, after disagreements with the Ivy League members. The women's league, the WHEA, began play in 2002.

On October 5, 2011, the University of Notre Dame Fighting Irish (an ACC member outside football) announced they would be joining Hockey East as the conference's first non-New England school in 2013 after the CCHA folded. On March 22, 2016, Notre Dame subsequently announced their men's hockey team would leave Hockey East for the Big Ten Conference at the start of the 2017–2018 season.  The University of Connecticut (UConn) and Hockey East jointly announced on June 21, 2012, that UConn's men's team, then in Atlantic Hockey, would join the school's women's team in Hockey East in 2014. On October 24, 2013, Merrimack College, already a member of the Hockey East men's league, announced that it would upgrade its women's team from club level to full varsity status effective in 2015 and join the Hockey East women's league.

On May 2, 2017, the College of the Holy Cross announced that it would join Hockey East for women's hockey only starting in 2018–19.

Members
There are currently 12 member schools, with 11 participating in the men's division and 10 in the women's division.

Former members

Membership timeline

Conference records

Men's
Team's records against current conference opponents. (As of the end of the 2020–21 season.)

Champions

Men's

The Hockey East Championship Game has been held in Boston since 1987, first at the Boston Garden and now the TD Garden, since 1996. The first two were held in Providence, Rhode Island at the Providence Civic Center (now the Dunkin' Donuts Center).

The final game and the semifinal games are held on consecutive nights in mid-March at the Garden. The quarterfinal round takes place the previous weekend. The top eight teams in the league advance to the quarterfinal round: the quarterfinal round series are 2-out-of-3 series with all games played at the higher seed's rink. There have been two cases where the #8 seed won on the #1 team's ice.

Women's

The Hockey East Championship was held in Boston from its inception in 2003 until 2007. The event was held at Northeastern's Matthews Arena in 2003 and 2004 before moving to BU's Walter Brown Arena in 2005. The tournament returned to Matthews Arena in 2006, was held at UNH's Whittemore Center in 2007, and at UConn's Mark Edward Freitas Ice Forum in 2008. The tournament went back to UNH in 2009, Providence in 2010, and the last campus to host was Boston University in 2011. The tournament moved to Hyannis, Massachusetts in 2012, and Lawler Arena on the Merrimack College campus in North Andover, Massachusetts in 2016.

Rivalries
Boston College, Boston University, and Northeastern all take part in the annual Beanpot tournament with Harvard of ECAC Hockey.

The previously existing fierce rivalry between Boston College and Notre Dame, the Holy War on Ice, became a conference matchup with Notre Dame's arrival in Hockey East. The two are rivals in other sports as well, as both are members of the Atlantic Coast Conference for most sports (though Notre Dame's football team remains independent, they play BC in that sport on a regular basis). Maine also has a major rivalry with New Hampshire, often called "The Border War". Providence and UConn also have a great rivalry which spills over from the basketball court.

Conference arenas

Awards

Men's
At the conclusion of each regular season schedule the coaches of each Hockey East team vote which players they choose to be on the three All-Conference Teams: first team, second team and rookie team (except for 1985–86 when no rookie team was selected). Additionally they vote to award up to 6 individual trophies to an eligible player at the same time. Hockey East also awards a Conference Tournament Most Valuable Player and names a tournament all-star team, which are voted on at the conclusion of the conference tournament. Four of these awards have been bestowed every year that Hockey East has been in operation. In addition, the Scoring Champion and Goaltending Champions are named based solely on statistics the players made during the season.

All-Conference Teams

Individual awards

Team Awards

Women's
The award for the top HEA player each year is the Cammi Granato Award, awarded since 2009.  The NCAA Division I Women's Ice Hockey Player of the year, the Patty Kazmaier Award, has been won by HEA players Brooke Whitney (Northeastern) in 2002, Alexandra Carpenter (Boston College) in 2015, Kendall Coyne (Northeastern) in 2016, Daryl Watts (Boston College) in 2018, and Aerin Frankel (Northeastern) in 2021.

Television rights
Since the 2019–2020 season, Hockey East games have aired regionally on NESN and are available in the rest of the United States and in Canada on Paramount+ and SportsLive.

Games previously aired nationally on NBCSN through the 2016 Hockey East Championship game, and on American Sports Network prior to the service's closure.

On April 6, 2022, Hockey East reached a six-year media rights agreement with ESPN and ESPN+ that will bring games to ESPN's television and streaming platforms;

300 games per season with all contests available on ESPN+.
3 games per season that will air on ESPNU.

References

External links
Hockey East home page

 
Wakefield, Massachusetts
College ice hockey conferences in the United States